Emiliya Ivanova Tsvetkova (born 8 November 1981), known professionally as Emanuela is a Bulgarian pop-folk singer. In 2006, she signed with Ara Music. From 2008 to 2013 she released three albums before departing Ara in mid-2015, after she decided not to renew her contract. Following the departure, she signed with Payner.

Discography
 2008 - "Zapoznay ya s men"
 2010 - "Burya ot emotsii"
 2013 - "Emanuela"
 2018 - "Notarialno zaveren"

References

External links 
 Emanuela at Facebook
 Emanuela at Instagram
 Emanuela at payner.bg
 Emanuela at aramusic.bg (Archived)

Living people
1981 births
21st-century Bulgarian women singers
Bulgarian folk-pop singers
Musicians from Sofia
Payner artists